Dan Graur \ˈɡra.ur\ (born July 24, 1953, in Piatra Neamț) is a Romanian-American scientist working in the field of molecular evolution. He is a Moores Professor at the University of Houston and Professor Emeritus of Zoology at Tel Aviv University, Israel. He is coauthor along with Wen-Hsiung Li of Fundamentals of Molecular Evolution. His Molecular and Genome Evolution was published in 2016.

Education
Dan Graur earned a B.Sc. in biology and an M.Sc. in Zoology from Tel Aviv University. In 1985 Graur received his Ph.D. at the University of Texas Health Science Center at Houston for research supervised by Masatoshi Nei. He conducted postdoctoral research at the University of Tübingen, Germany.

Career
From 1986 to 2003 he worked in the Department of Zoology at Tel Aviv University. He retired in 2006 as Norman and Rose Lederer Professor Emeritus of Zoology. In 2003, he moved to the University of Houston. From 2009 to 2011 he has held the position of Councillor for the Society for Molecular Biology and Evolution. Graur has been noted for his criticisms of the ENCODE project.

Awards and honors
In 2011 Graur was awarded the Humboldt Prize. In 2015, he was elected fellow of the American Association for the Advancement of Science.

References

Living people
University of Houston faculty
Romanian emigrants to the United States
University of Texas Health Science Center at Houston alumni
Jewish American scientists
American people of Romanian-Jewish descent
1953 births
People from Piatra Neamț
Tel Aviv University alumni
Academic staff of Tel Aviv University
21st-century American Jews